"Insensitive" is the second single released from Canadian singer-songwriter Jann Arden's second studio album, Living Under June (1994). Written by Anne Loree and produced by Ed Cherney, the song became Arden's most successful single, reaching number one in Canada and Australia and number 12 in the United States.

Background
Anne Loree would recall writing "Insensitive" in response to an unhappy tryst with a chef at a Calgary restaurant where Loree was waiting tables. "I sat down at my electric piano in the basement of a rented house I shared with four roommates, broke and brokenhearted, full of pain and angst, and wrote 'Insensitive'. It took me probably less than half an hour and I walked away feeling much better for it and much hipper to Prince Charmings who aren't really into you." Jann Arden, then based in Calgary, optioned "Insensitive" for Living Under June after hearing Loree perform the song at a local club.

"Insensitive" remains by far Arden's most successful single to date. It reached number one in her native Canada for three weeks, number 12 on the US Billboard Hot 100, and number four on Billboards Adult Contemporary chart. The song's US success was assisted by its presence in the film Bed of Roses; although Bed of Roses was not a major success, the video for "Insensitive" was aired on an episode of Entertainment Tonight, on which the film had been promoted. Its Italian success was occasioned by its use as a jingle in a TV ad campaign for department store Coin. On August 20, 1995, "Insensitive" reached number one on the Australian ARIA Singles Chart for one week, and it also charted in New Zealand at number 44 and in the United Kingdom at number 40. At the Juno Awards of 1996 "Insensitive" was named Single of the Year.

"Insensitive" was also included on Jann's 2001 greatest hits album, Greatest Hurts, in both the original and live versions.

Music video
For the track's US release a video was prepped comprising clips from the film Bed of Roses interspersed with footage of Jann singing the song; Jeth Weinrich directed. The video for "Insensitive" was nominated for Video of the Year at the 1995 Juno Awards.

Track listingsCanadian cassette singleA. "Insensitive" – 4:16
B. "I Just Don't Love You Anymore" – 3:54US CD single "Insensitive" (LP version) – 4:16
 "Gasoline" (live from KKOS) – 4:18US maxi-CD single "Insensitive" (LP version) – 4:16
 "Gasoline" (live from KKOS) – 4:18
 "Still Here" – 3:47
 "Cuts" – 2:59US cassette single "Insensitive" (remix) – 4:12
 "Gasoline" (live from KKOS) – 4:18UK CD single "Insensitive"
 "Frankie in the Rain"
 "Living Under June"
 "It Looks Like Rain"UK cassette singleA. "Insensitive"
B. "Frankie in the Rain"European and Australian CD single "Insensitive" – 4:16
 "I Would Die for You" – 4:36
 "Gasoline" (live version) – 4:26

Credits and personnel
Credits are taken from the US cassette single sleeve.Studios Recorded at Groove Masters (Santa Monica, California, US)
 Mixed at Brooklyn Recording Studio (Los Angeles)Personnel'''

 Anne Loree – writing
 Jann Arden – vocals, co-production, arrangement
 Ed Cherney – production, recording, mixing, arrangement
 Neil MacGonigill – executive production

 Duane Seykora – recording
 Jeffery "C.J." Vanston – arrangement
 Dillon O'Brian – background vocals arrangement

Charts

Weekly charts

Year-end charts

Certifications

Release history

Cover versions
Country singer LeAnn Rimes also released her own version of "Insensitive" on her 1998 album Sittin' on Top of the World. Jasper Steverlinck remade "Insensitive" for his 2004 album Songs of Innocence.  Kitchener-Waterloo, Ontario-based punk rock band The Decay also released a cover version on the Juicebox Recording Co. compilation Our Favourite Songs.

Australian singer Beccy Cole recorded a version for her album, Preloved'' (2010).

In popular culture
The popular podcast "How to Do Everything" created by the producers of the NPR news quiz "Wait Wait... Don't Tell Me!" featured the song in a series of podcasts. The song was introduced by a music expert when asked if there was a song she loved, but understood was terrible. This began a segment on the podcast titled "Best-Worst Song Competition" where listeners submitted songs they secretly enjoyed, but knew were generally considered to be poor songs. Each segment opened with a clip of "Insensitive" with the hosts saying "You know what that sound means – it's time for our Best-Worst Song Competition!"

References

External links
 Song lyrics

1994 songs
1995 singles
Jann Arden songs
LeAnn Rimes songs
Number-one singles in Australia
RPM Top Singles number-one singles